Kalajärvi Reservoir is a medium-sized lake of Finland.  It is located in the city of Seinäjoki in Southern Ostrobothnia. The reservoir was built on the site of a smaller lake, and finished in 1977.

See also
List of lakes in Finland

References

External links
 Photos in Trekart Looter of the Lake

Reservoirs in Finland
Landforms of South Ostrobothnia
Lakes of Seinäjoki